Chrostosoma mysia is a moth of the subfamily Arctiinae. It was described by Herbert Druce in 1906. It is found in Peru.

References

BHL

Chrostosoma
Moths described in 1906